Anita Corbin (born 1958) is a British photographer.  Her collections and exhibitions include Visible Girls (1981) and First Women UK (2018).

The National Portrait Gallery holds eight of her works.

References

External links 
Visible Girls Revisited
First Women UK
Just do it! – coverage of Anita Corbin and the First Women by BBC Newsnight

Living people
1958 births
English photographers
English women photographers